Bretman Rock Sacayanan Laforga (born July 31, 1998) is a Filipino beauty influencer and social media personality based in Honolulu, Hawaii. He rose to fame as a creator on YouTube and Vine after one of his contouring videos went viral in 2015. Rock is known for making makeup tutorials and his humorous views on life. He has starred in his own reality TV show, MTV's Following: Bretman Rock (2021), has featured in several music videos, and in October 2021 was the first openly gay man to appear on the cover of Playboy.

Rock has received multiple awards and honors for his work on social media including a People's Choice award for "Beauty Influencer" and an award for "Breakthrough Social Star" at the 2021 MTV Movie and TV Awards.

Early life 
Bretman Rock Sacayanan Laforga was born on July 31, 1998, in Sanchez-Mira, Cagayan, Philippines, in an Ilocano family. His father, Edmund Laforga, was a fan of professional wrestling and named him after Bret Hart and The Rock. Rock moved to Hawaii at the age of seven and played sports while growing up including baseball, soccer, cross-country, and volleyball. At Campbell High School, Rock was on the track team.

Career 
Rock started as a comedian and meme creator on YouTube and Vine before shifting to vlogs and beauty tutorials. He is also known for his humorous views on life. In 2016, one of Rock's contouring videos went viral. He was inspired by vlogger Talia Joy and makeup artist Patrick Starrr. Also in 2016, he signed a management contract under ABS-CBN's Adober Studios, a creator network on social media owned by the Philippines' largest media conglomerate ABS-CBN Corporation.

His younger sister, Princess Mae, and her daughter, Cleo, and their cousin, Keiffer ("Miss K"), frequently appear in Rock's videos, such as for mukbang. His friend, Larry, and his former editor, Agatha Danglapin, also made several brief appearances in his videos. Though he rarely features other influencers on his channel, Rock has collaborated with James Charles, Bella Poarch, Nikita Dragun, and Chelsea Handler.

In 2017, Time magazine recognized him among the 30 Most Influential Teens. He was also included in Forbes "30 Under 30 Asia – Media, Marketing, & Advertising" list in 2018.

In June 2019, Rock was featured on the Pride Month cover of Gay Times. In September 2019, Rock attended his first New York Fashion Week where he collaborated with stylist Andrew Gelwicks.

Rock played the role of "The Playboy" in the ten-episode fourth season of the YouTube Premium web series Escape the Night, released in July 2019. In December 2019, MTV announced that Rock would be the star of the next season of the YouTube show, No Filter.

In Early 2020, Rock launched his makeup collection in collaboration with wet n wild cosmetics. He had a February 2020 press tour in Los Angeles with brands like Buzzfeed, Condé Nast, Hearst, and more, to promote the line.

On May 9, 2020, Rock appeared as a guest star on the third episode of James Charles' YouTube Originals series, "Instant Influencer". In November 2020, Rock launched his eyewear collection, specifically sunglasses, in collaboration with Dime Optics, a Los Angeles-based brand. He released six frames, four of which were launched at Dime Optics, while two were launched exclusively at Revolve.

On May 14, 2021, Rock had a cameo in Bella Poarch's music video for her debut single, "Build a Bitch", alongside other internet personalities. In June 2021, Rock was nominated for an MTV Movie and TV Award for the Breakthrough Social Star category. He was announced as the winner on the day of the ceremony.

In August 2021, Rock made a cameo appearance in the music video for Sub Urban and Bella Poarch's song, "INFERNO". He also participated in a stream promoting the video.

In October 2021, Rock became the first openly gay man to feature on the cover of Playboy magazine.

MTV Following: Bretman Rock
On January 28, 2021, MTV announced that Bretman Rock would be starring on his own reality TV show titled MTV Following: Bretman Rock. On February 9, 2021, the first episode of his show premiered on MTV's official YouTube channel. Episodes of the show were released every Monday with six episodes in total. The show  was filmed in Hawaii, where Rock is also based, and includes "a glimpse into [his] family life". The cast of the show is made up of Rock and his family alongside his close friends.

30 Days With: Bretman Rock
On June 15, 2021, YouTube Originals announced that Rock would be the next subject of their 30 Days With documentary series franchise, as he tries to survive a week in the Hawaiian jungle while on his own. Four episodes were released on Wednesday nights on YouTube, from June 30 to July 21, 2021.

Personal life 
In November 2019, Rock's father died after being in a coma. His mother, Mercedita, appears in his videos occasionally. Rock is Ilocano.

Rock is openly gay and shared that he was in his first relationship in a September 2019 interview with Elle, Rock is also non-binary, and uses all pronouns.

In April 2020, Rock requested on social media that fans not visit his home uninvited, especially during the COVID-19 pandemic.

Filmography

Awards and honors 
Rock was a finalist for the Shorty Award for Breakout YouTuber in 2017. Time recognized him as one of the "30 Most Influential Teens" in 2017, and he was included in the Forbes "30 Under 30 Asia – Media, Marketing, & Advertising" list in 2018. In 2019, Rock won the Beauty Influencer award at the 45th People's Choice Awards. In 2020, he was a finalist in comedy video at the Shorty Awards. In 2020, Rock was included on Variety's 2020 Power of Young Hollywood list.

References

External links 
 
 
 Bretman Rock

American bloggers
American people of Ilocano descent
American YouTubers
American gay men
Beauty and makeup YouTubers
Comedy YouTubers
Filipino emigrants to the United States
Filipino YouTubers
Hawaii people of Filipino descent
American LGBT people of Asian descent
American LGBT entertainers
LGBT people from Hawaii
Filipino LGBT entertainers
Filipino gay men
LGBT YouTubers
Living people
People from Oahu
YouTube vloggers
1998 births
Non-binary entertainers